Joseph Taylor (7 September 1886 – 3 September 1954) was an Australian cricketer. He played two first-class matches for New South Wales between 1911/12 and 1913/14 and one first-class match for Wellington in 1927/28.

See also
 List of New South Wales representative cricketers

References

External links
 

1886 births
1954 deaths
Australian cricketers
New South Wales cricketers
Wellington cricketers
Cricketers from Sydney